George Burling may refer to:

 George C. Burling (1834–1885), U.S. Union Army officer during the American Civil War
 George T. Burling (1849–1928), American banker and politician from New York

See also
 George Beurling (1921–1948), Canadian fighter pilot